Eurydictyon is an extinct genus of beetle in the family Ommatidae which contains a single species, Eurydictyon conspicuum. E. conspicuum lived during the Pliensbachian stage of the Early Jurassic, between 189.6 and 183.0 Ma. It measured 18 x 8 mm in length and is known only from specimens found in Kyrgyzstan.

References

Ommatidae
†